Michiyo Hashimoto (born 6 July 1972) is a Japanese snowboarder. She competed in the women's halfpipe event at the 2002 Winter Olympics.

References

1972 births
Living people
Japanese female snowboarders
Olympic snowboarders of Japan
Snowboarders at the 2002 Winter Olympics
Sportspeople from Osaka Prefecture
21st-century Japanese women